Peñaranda, officially the Municipality of Peñaranda, is a 4th class municipality in the province of Nueva Ecija, Philippines. According to the 2020 census, it has a population of 32,269 people.

It is bordered by municipalities of General Tinio and San Leonardo and the city of Gapan.

The area was originally called Mapisong, and it was a part of the municipality of Gapan. The area was organized into a municipality by José Maria Peñaranda, a Spanish engineer, and subsequently named after him.

Peñaranda was once known for its high quality crop called ikmo, a plant used by older Filipinos as a chewing substance. Recently however, the crop is on the brink of extinction. Rice remains a flourishing farm produce.

In 2012, the National Commission for Culture and the Arts (NCCA) and the ICHCAP of UNESCO published Pinagmulan: Enumeration from the Philippine Inventory of Intangible Cultural Heritage. The first edition of the UNESCO-backed book included Nueva Ecija's Arakyo, signifying its great importance to Philippine intangible cultural heritage. The local government of Nueva Ecija, in cooperation with the NCCA, is given the right to nominate the Arakyo in the UNESCO Intangible Cultural Heritage Lists.

Geography

Barangays
Peñaranda is politically subdivided into 10 barangays.

 Callos
 Las Piñas
 Poblacion I
 Poblacion II
 Poblacion III
 Poblacion IV
 Santo Tomas
 Sinasajan
 San Josef
 San Mariano (Maugat)

Climate

Demographics

Religion
Majority of the people is Roman Catholic. Other religious groups have churches and places of worship in the municipality.

Economy 

Primarily depends on rice & vegetable farming, poultry and piggery.

Culture 
Every May, Peñaranda residents stage a musical drama called "Araquio", a re-enactment of Christians' quest led by Queen Helena and King Constantine for the Holy Cross where Jesus Christ was nailed. Actors and actresses garbed in colorful and cute costumes dramatize this century old tradition which features sword fights between the Christians and Moros.

Peñaranda is also known for its mouth-watering, native rice cakes such as espasol, putong puti and sapin-sapin .

Schedule of Barangay Fiesta:

 Santo Tomas - every First weekend of the month of May
 Callos - every 5th & 6th day of the month of May
 Las Piñas - every 11th & 12th day of the month of May
 San Joseph - every Third weekend of the month of May
 Sinasajan - every 21st & 22nd day of the month of May
 Poblacion I-IV (Town Fiesta) - every Last weekend of the month of May
 San Mariano - (TBA)

Education
Nueva Ecija University of Science and Technology Peñaranda Off-Campus (Academic Extended Venue) commenced operation in June 2005. This is a joint undertaking of the Nueva Ecija University of Science and Technology and the Local Government Unit of Peñaranda, Nueva Ecija. It was first operated during the term of Former Mayor Felix A. Corpuz. It is located at the vicinity of the Penaranda National High School. The first administrator was Nomereo J. Gaboy, a retired School Principal. Peñaranda Campus is under the administration of Mayor Ferdinand R. Abesamis and Mr. German L. Del Rosario is the Campus Administrator.

Gallery

References

External links

 [ Philippine Standard Geographic Code]
Philippine Census Information
Local Governance Performance Management System

Municipalities of Nueva Ecija